Carry On is a 4-CD career retrospective box set by Stephen Stills (not to be confused with the CSN compilation released in 1991). It features highlights from his career as a solo artist and with groups including The Au Go Go Singers, Buffalo Springfield, Manassas, and various permutations of CSN&Y.  The tracks are arranged in general chronological order of release.  The album also includes previously unreleased material.

The album was compiled by Graham Nash, who also compiled box sets for himself and for David Crosby.
All songs written by Stephen Stills except where noted.

Track listing
Disc One
"Travelin'" (mono) — Stephen Stills
 Recorded at a Voice of America radio relay station, San Jose, Costa Rica, 1962. Previously unreleased.
"High Flyin' Bird" (Billy Edd Wheeler) — The Au Go Go Singers
 From the album They Call Us The Au Go Go Singers, 1964
"Sit Down, I Think I Love You" (mono) — Buffalo Springfield
 From the album Buffalo Springfield, 1966
"Go and Say Goodbye" (mono) — Buffalo Springfield
 From the album Buffalo Springfield, 1966
"For What It's Worth" (mono) — Buffalo Springfield
 From the album Buffalo Springfield (second version), 1967
"Everydays" — Buffalo Springfield
 Originally released on the album Buffalo Springfield Again, 1967; 2012 remix, previously unreleased
"Pretty Girl Why" — Buffalo Springfield
 Originally released on the album Last Time Around, 1968; alternate mix first appeared on the 2001 Buffalo Springfield box set
 Note the CD booklet erroneously says originally released on Buffalo Springfield Again
"Bluebird" — Buffalo Springfield
 From the album Buffalo Springfield Again, 1967
"Rock & Roll Woman" — Buffalo Springfield
 From the album Buffalo Springfield Again, 1967
"Special Care" — Buffalo Springfield
 From the album Last Time Around, 1968
"Questions" — Buffalo Springfield
 From the album Last Time Around, 1968
"Uno Mundo" — Buffalo Springfield
 From the 45 rpm single, 1968, previously unavailable on CD
"Four Days Gone" — Buffalo Springfield
 Originally released on the album Last Time Around, 1968; demo version first appeared on the 2001 Buffalo Springfield box set
"Who Ran Away?" — Stephen Stills
 Recorded July 10, 1968; 2012 remix, previously unreleased song
"49 Reasons" — Stephen Stills
 Recorded July 10, 1968; previously unreleased demo version of song later appearing as 49 Bye-Byes on Crosby, Stills & Nash
"Helplessly Hoping" — Crosby, Stills & Nash
 From the album Crosby, Stills & Nash, 1969
"You Don't Have to Cry" — Crosby, Stills & Nash
 From the album Crosby, Stills & Nash, 1969
"Suite: Judy Blue Eyes" — Crosby, Stills & Nash
 From the album Crosby, Stills & Nash, 1969
"4+20" — Stephen Stills
 Originally released on the album Déjà Vu, 1970; recorded July 19, 1969, 2012 remix, previously unreleased 
"So Begins the Task" — Stephen Stills
 Originally released on the album Manassas, 1972; recorded July 1969, previously unreleased demo version
"The Lee Shore" (David Crosby) — Stephen Stills
 Originally released on the album 4 Way Street, 1971; recorded July 15, 1969, previously unreleased demo version
"Carry On/Questions" — Crosby, Stills, Nash & Young
 Originally released on the album Déjà Vu, 1970; December 1969 alternate mix previously unreleased
"Woodstock" (Joni Mitchell) — Crosby, Stills, Nash & Young
 Originally released on the album Déjà Vu, 1970; alternate mix first appeared on the 1991 CSN box set

Disc Two
"Love the One You're With" — Stephen Stills
 Originally released on the album Stephen Stills, 1970; 45 rpm single mix, previously unavailable on CD
"Old Times Good Times" — Stephen Stills
 From the album Stephen Stills, 1970
"Black Queen" — Stephen Stills
 From the album Stephen Stills, 1970
"No-Name Jam" (Stills/Hendrix) — Stephen Stills feat. Jimi Hendrix
 Recorded March 1970, previously unreleased jam
"Go Back Home " — Stephen Stills  feat. Eric Clapton
 From the album Stephen Stills, 1970
"Marianne" — Stephen Stills
 From the album Stephen Stills 2, 1971
"My Love Is a Gentle Thing" — Stephen Stills
 Recorded 1970/75, from the Manassas compilation album Pieces, 1971
"Fishes and Scorpions" — Stephen Stills
 From the album Stephen Stills 2, 1971
"The Treasure" — Stephen Stills
 Recorded March 1970; originally released on the album Manassas, 1972; previously unreleased studio version
"To a Flame" — Stephen Stills
 Originally released on the album Stephen Stills, 1970; 2012 mix previously unreleased
"Cherokee" — Stephen Stills feat. The Memphis Horns
 From the album Stephen Stills, 1970
"Song of Love" — Stephen Stills
 From the album Manassas, 1972
"Rock & Roll Crazies/Cuban Bluegrass" (Stills/Taylor)/(Stills/Lala) — Stephen Stills
 From the album Manassas, 1972
"Jet Set (Sigh)" — Stephen Stills
 From the album Manassas, 1972
"It Doesn't Matter" (Stills/Hillman) — Stephen Stills
 From the album Manassas, 1972
"Colorado" — Stephen Stills
 From the album Manassas, 1972
"Johnny's Garden" — Stephen Stills
 From the album Manassas, 1972
"Change Partners" — Stephen Stills
 Originally released on the album Stephen Stills 2, 1971; 2012 mix previously unreleased
"Do for the Others" — Stephen Stills feat. Steven Fromholz
 Originally released on the album Stephen Stills, 1970; previously unreleased 1971 live version (Madison Square Garden, New York,  July 30, 1971)
"Find the Cost of Freedom" — Crosby, Stills, Nash & Young
 Originally released as the B-side of the 45 rpm single Ohio, 1971; previously unreleased 1971 live version (Music Hall, Boston, Oct. 3, 1971)
"Little Miss Bright Eyes" — Stephen Stills
 Recorded August 1973, previously unreleased
"Isn't It About Time" — Stephen Stills
 From the Manassas album Down the Road, 1973

Disc Three
"Turn Back the Pages" (Stills/Dacus) — Stephen Stills
 From the album Stills, 1975
"First Things First"(Stills/Schermetzler/Smith) — Stephen Stills
 Originally released on the album Stills, 1975; previously unreleased version with extended intro
"My Angel" (Stills/Taylor) — Stephen Stills
 Originally released on the album Stills, 1975; previously unreleased 1973 mix
"Love Story" — Stephen Stills
 From the album Stills, 1975
"As I Come of Age " — Stephen Stills
 Originally released on the album Stills, 1975; previously unreleased 1973 mix
"Know You Got to Run" (Stills/Hopkins) — Stephen Stills
 Song originally appeared on the album Stephen Stills 2, 1971. Recorded at the Paramount Theater, Seattle, December 8, 1975; previously unreleased live version
"Black Coral" — Crosby, Stills, Nash & Young
 Song originally appeared on the 1976 Stills-Young Band album Long May You Run; previously unreleased version
"I Give You Give Blind" — Crosby, Stills & Nash
Originally released on the 1977 Crosby, Stills & Nash album CSN; 1976 mix appeared on the album Replay
"Crossroads/You Can't Catch Me" (Johnson/Berry) — Stephen Stills
Medley originally appeared  on the 1975 album Stephen Stills Live. Recorded at a CSN show at the Civic Center, Lakeland, FL, November 19, 1977, previously unreleased live version
"See the Changes" — Crosby, Stills & Nash
 Originally released on the album CSN, 1977; 2012 remix, previously unreleased
"Thoroughfare Gap" — Stephen Stills
 From the album Thoroughfare Gap, 1978
"Lowdown" — Stephen Stills
 From the album Thoroughfare Gap, 1978
"Cuba al Fin [edit]" — Stephen Stills
 From the album Havana Jam, 1979
"Dear Mr. Fantasy" (Winwood/Capaldi/Wood) — Stephen Stills feat. Graham Nash
 Full-length version of the song originally appeared on the 1991 CSN box set
"Spanish Suite" — Stephen Stills feat. Herbie Hancock
 1979 recording from the album Man Alive!, 2005
"Feel Your Love" — Crosby, Stills & Nash
 From the expanded CD version of Daylight Again, 1982/2006
"Raise a Voice" (Nash/Stills) — Crosby, Stills & Nash
 From the album Allies, 1983
"Daylight Again/Find the Cost of Freedom" — Crosby, Stills & Nash
 From the album Daylight Again, 1982

Disc Four
"Southern Cross" (Stills/Curtis/Curtis) — Crosby, Stills & Nash
 From the album Daylight Again, 1982
"Dark Star" — Crosby, Stills & Nash
 From the album Allies, 1983
"Turn Your Back on Love" (Stills/Nash/Stergis) — Crosby, Stills & Nash
 From the album Allies, 1983
"War Games" — Crosby, Stills & Nash
 From the album Allies, 1983
"50/50" (Stills/Lala) — Stephen Stills
 From the album Right by You, 1984
"Welfare Blues" — Stephen Stills
 Recorded live Cookham, Berkshire, UK, February 5, 1984; previously unreleased song
"Church (Part of Someone)" — Stephen Stills
 Originally released on the album Stephen Stills, 1970; previously unreleased studio version
"I Don't Get It" — Stephen Stills
 1991 recording from the album Man Alive!, 2005
"Isn't It So " — Stephen Stills
 From the album Stills Alone, 1991
"Haven't We Lost Enough?" (Stills/Cronin) — Crosby, Stills & Nash
 From the album Live It Up, 1990
"The Ballad of Hollis Brown" (Dylan) — Stephen Stills
 From the album Stills Alone, 1991
"Treetop Flyer " — Stephen Stills
 From the album Stills Alone, 1991
"Heart's Gate" — Stephen Stills
 From the album Man Alive!, 2005
"Girl from the North Country" (Dylan)— Crosby, Stills & Nash
 Recorded live at the Beacon Theater, New York City, October 2012; previously unreleased live version
"Feed the People" — Stephen Stills
 1989 recording from the album Man Alive!, 2005
"Panama" — Crosby, Stills & Nash
 From the album After the Storm, 1994
"No Tears Left" — Crosby, Stills & Nash
 Recorded live at the Fillmore Auditorium, San Francisco, September 14, 1997; previously unreleased live version
"Ole Man Trouble" (Redding) — Crosby, Stills, Nash & Young
 Recorded live at Madison Square Garden, New York City, February 22, 2002; previously unreleased live version
"Ain't It Always" — Stephen Stills
 1976 recording from the album Man Alive!, 2005

Charts

References

Stephen Stills albums
2013 compilation albums
Rhino Records compilation albums
Stephen Stills compilation albums